Great Britain football team may refer to the following -

 Great Britain Olympic football team
 Great Britain women's Olympic football team
 United Kingdom national football team